Løkeberg is a district in the municipality of Bærum, Norway. Its population (2007) is 4,568.

References

Villages in Akershus
Bærum